The 1984 Australian Endurance Championship was a CAMS sanctioned motor racing competition open to Group C Touring Cars. The championship, which was the fourth Australian Endurance Championship, was contested over a five-round series. Titles were awarded for both Drivers and Makes with Allan Moffat winning the Drivers title and Mazda winning the Makes award.

Calendar
The championship was contested over a five-round series with one race per round.

Classes
Cars competed in two classes:
 Up to 3000 cc
 Over 3000 cc

Points system
Drivers Championship points were awarded to the drivers of the cars filling the first twenty places in each round, with the actual points allocation dependent on the class in which the car was competing.

Makes Championship points were awarded on the same basis but only for the highest scoring car of each make.

Championship results

Drivers

Note: Only the top five pointscorers are shown.

Makes

References

External links
 1984 Silastic 300 video, www.youtube.com
 1984 Motorcraft 300 video, www.youtube.com

Australian Endurance Championship
Endurance Championship
Australian Manufacturers' Championship